Vulturó is a mountain located in the comarca of Alt Urgell in Catalonia, Spain. It has an elevation of 2,648 metres above sea level. It is the highest mountain in the Serra del Cadí mountain range, and in the Catalan Pre-Pyrenees.

References

Mountains of Catalonia
Pre-Pyrenees